The 2015 CFL Draft took place on Tuesday, May 12, 2015, at 8:00 PM ET on TSN2 and RDS2. 62 players were chosen from among eligible players from Canadian Universities across the country, as well as Canadian players playing in the NCAA.

For the first time since the 2006 CFL Draft, an NCAA player was drafted first overall, with Alex Mateas from the University of Connecticut being selected with the top pick. Six offensive linemen were drafted in the first round, which broke the previous record of five in the 1987 CFL Draft. A total of 44 CIS football players were selected in the draft with the Calgary Dinos earning the most selected players with seven, including two within the first three picks. 13 trades were made involving 15 draft picks, with all of the trades occurring before the draft.

The first two rounds were broadcast live on TSN with CFL Commissioner Jeffrey Orridge announcing each selection. The production was hosted by Farhan Lalji and featured the CFL on TSN panel which included Duane Forde, Paul LaPolice, Mike Benevides, and Lee Barrette who analyzed the teams' needs and picks.

Top prospects 
Source: CFL Scouting Bureau rankings.

Trades
In the explanations below, (D) denotes trades that took place during the draft, while (PD) indicates trades completed pre-draft.

Round one
 Hamilton → Montreal (PD). Hamilton traded this selection and a third-round pick in the draft to Montreal for Ryan Bomben.

Round two
 Saskatchewan → Winnipeg (PD). Saskatchewan traded this selection and Kris Bastien to Winnipeg for Cory Watson and a third-round selection in the draft.

Round three
 Ottawa → Calgary (PD). Ottawa traded this selection and a third-round pick in the 2014 CFL Draft to Calgary for Justin Phillips and a third-round selection in the 2014 CFL Draft.
 Saskatchewan → Hamilton (PD). Saskatchewan traded this selection and a third-round pick in the 2016 CFL Draft to Hamilton for Brandon Boudreaux, a fourth-round pick in this year's draft and a fourth-round pick in the 2016 CFL Draft.
 Winnipeg → Saskatchewan (PD). Winnipeg traded this selection and Cory Watson to Saskatchewan for Kris Bastien and a second-round selection in the draft.
 Winnipeg → Hamilton (PD). Winnipeg traded this selection to Hamilton for Abraham Kromah and a third-round pick in the draft.
 Hamilton → Winnipeg  (PD). Hamilton traded this selection and Abraham Kromah to Winnipeg for a third-round pick in the draft.
 Hamilton → Montreal (PD). Hamilton traded this selection and a first-round pick in the draft to Montreal for Ryan Bomben.
 Montreal → Calgary (PD). Montreal traded this conditional selection (which became a third-round pick) and a fifth-round selection in the 2014 CFL Draft to Calgary for Larry Taylor, a fifth-round selection in the 2014 CFL Draft, and a conditional selection in this year's draft (which became a fourth-round pick).

Round four
 Saskatchewan → Winnipeg (PD). Saskatchewan traded this selection and Patrick Neufeld to Winnipeg for Alex Hall and a second-round pick in the 2014 CFL Draft.
 Hamilton → Saskatchewan (PD). Hamilton traded this selection, Brandon Boudreaux, and a fourth-round pick in the 2016 CFL Draft to Saskatchewan for a third-round pick in this year's draft and a third-round pick in the 2016 CFL Draft.
 Winnipeg → Hamilton (PD). Winnipeg traded this conditional selection (which became a fourth-round pick) to Hamilton for Brian Brohm.
 Calgary → Montreal (PD). Calgary traded this conditional selection (which became a fourth-round pick), a fifth-round selection in the 2014 CFL Draft, and Larry Taylor to Montreal for a fifth-round selection in the 2014 CFL Draft and a conditional selection (which became a third-round pick).

Round five
 Hamilton → BC (PD). Hamilton traded this selection to BC for Seydou Junior Haidara.

Round six
 Edmonton → Hamilton (PD). Edmonton traded this selection and Ricardo Colclough to Hamilton for Darcy Brown.
 Toronto → Saskatchewan (PD). Toronto traded a conditional selection (which became a sixth round pick) to Saskatchewan for Dwight Anderson.

Round seven
 Winnipeg → Toronto (PD). Winnipeg traded a conditional selection (which became a seventh round pick) to Toronto for Josh Portis.

Conditional trades
 Calgary → Hamilton (PD). Calgary traded a conditional selection (condition not met) to Hamilton for Dee Webb.
 Edmonton → Hamilton (PD). Edmonton traded a conditional selection (condition not met) and a fourth-round pick in the 2016 CFL Draft to Hamilton for Steve Myddelton.

Forfeitures
 Edmonton forfeits their fifth round selection after selecting Mike Dubuisson in the 2014 Supplemental Draft.

Draft order

Round one

Round two

Round three

Round four

Round five

Round six

Round seven

References

Canadian College Draft
2015 in Canadian football